The 2018 Reading Borough Council election took place on 3 May 2018 to elect members of Reading Borough Council. There were three casual vacancies in Kentwood, Katesgrove and Church wards due to the early retirement of Councillors. The Labour Party held on to control of Reading Borough Council seeing their vote increase in seats across the Reading East constituency but suffering setbacks in the marginal seat of Kentwood where The Conservative Party gained a seat. The Conservatives also succeeded in gaining Tilehurst ward from the Liberal Democrats, reducing the Liberal Democrats to one remaining Councillor. The election was held on the same day as other local elections.

Election result

Ward results

Abbey

Battle

Caversham

Church

Katesgrove

Kentwood

Minster

Norcot

Park

Peppard

Redlands

Southcote

Thames

Tilehurst

Whitley

References

2018 English local elections
2018
2010s in Berkshire